Graham Robert Rahal (born January 4, 1989) is an American race car driver and small business owner. He currently participates in the IndyCar Series with Rahal Letterman Lanigan Racing, a team partially owned by his father Bobby Rahal, the winner of the 1986 Indianapolis 500.

Racing career

Early racing
In 2005, he won the Formula Atlantic class at the SCCA Runoffs and finished fourth in Star Mazda Series standings. He moved to a full-time ride in the Champ Car Atlantic Series in 2006, where he won five races and finished second in the season standings. He also drove in the Indy Pro Series event on the Indianapolis Motor Speedway road course in conjunction with the 2006 United States Grand Prix and finished second. SpeedTV reported in August 2006 that Rahal would drive for Newman/Haas Racing in the Champ Car World Series in 2007.

2007
On January 27 Rahal drove in the 24 Hours of Daytona. One of four drivers of the Southard Motorsports Lexus Riley, the car ran into early troubles and finished 62nd out of 70 entries. On March 18, he drove in the 12 Hours of Sebring American Le Mans Series race for his father's Rahal Letterman Racing team. He drove a Porsche 911 GT3-RSR with two other drivers, finishing 6th in the GT2 class and 15th overall.

On March 27 news reports from the previous summer were confirmed when he was announced as the second driver for Newman/Haas/Lanigan Racing in the Champ Car World Series and drove the No. 2 Panoz DP01 sponsored by MEDI|ZONE alongside his teammate, three-time series champion Sébastien Bourdais. On April 8 in his debut in the Champ Car World Series at the Vegas Grand Prix, Rahal hit the wall on the front stretch on the first lap and retired from the race. On April 15 at the Toyota Grand Prix of Long Beach he finished his first Champ Car race, ending up 8th. On April 22, in just his 3rd Champ Car race, he became the youngest ever podium finisher in Champ Car history after finishing 2nd in Houston. Rahal completed his rookie season in 5th place in series points with four podium finishes but without a race win.

2008
With the creation of a single American open-wheel racing series for 2008, Rahal and the Newman/Haas/Lanigan team became part of the IndyCar Series, including Rahal's first Indianapolis 500.

He missed the Gainsco Auto Insurance Indy 300 due to a crash in testing, after which his team could not get his car repaired in time for the race. He made his series debut at the second race of the season, the Honda Grand Prix of St. Petersburg and despite an early spin in the race, Rahal won the race by 3.5192 seconds from the two-time defending winner of the race, Hélio Castroneves. He became the youngest person at the time to win a major American open-wheel race – aged  – and the fourth to win in his first appearance in the IndyCar Series. The best finish Rahal would manage the rest of the year was a pair of 8th place finishes at Watkins Glen and Sonoma; he finished 17th in points, 4th among series rookies.

2009

Rahal returned to Newman/Haas/Lanigan for the 2009 IndyCar Series, taking over the No. 02 car with McDonald's as his sponsor.  He began the season by taking pole position at St. Petersburg, his first in his IndyCar career, thus becoming the youngest ever polesitter aged . This was the first time a Rahal had won an IndyCar pole since his father started first at Toronto in 1992, which was Bobby's third in a row that season. He finished seventh after damaging the car in a first-lap crash. His season was also undermined by bad relations with his team-mate Robert Doornbos – when Doornbos left midseason, Rahal commented "We could certainly have a second driver who is more of a team player." He finished the season 7th in points with two podium finishes.

Rahal was linked with the US F1 Team, the American-based Formula One team, that was set to debut in the 2010 World Championship. The team's sporting director, Peter Windsor, mentioned Rahal as a potential candidate for a seat with the Charlotte-based outfit. However, Windsor later decided against hiring either Rahal or Marco Andretti due to fears that they would not be able to get their FIA Super Licences in time for the 2010 season. Eventually, the team failed to compete in the 2010 Formula One season.

2010
Rahal did not return to Newman/Haas/Lanigan Racing for the 2010 IndyCar Series, due to McDonald's discontinuing their sponsorship to focus on the 2010 Winter Olympics.

On March 10, 2010, Sarah Fisher Racing announced Rahal would pilot Fisher's No. 67 Dollar General car in the first two North American events of 2010, the Honda Grand Prix of St. Petersburg and the Indy Grand Prix of Alabama. Fisher was originally planning on driving the races herself, in addition to seven oval races, before deciding that putting Rahal in the car could be a benefit to everyone, including Dollar General, who are based in Goodlettsville, Tennessee. On April 6, 2010, Sarah Fisher Racing announced the addition of the Grand Prix of Long Beach to Rahal's schedule. Rahal's placing in those three races was 9th, 17th, and 22nd (retired) respectively.

After the Grand Prix of Long Beach, Rahal was signed to drive for his father's team, Rahal Letterman Racing, in the 2010 Indianapolis 500. Rahal qualified in the seventh position for the race and finished 12th. On June 10, 2010, Dreyer & Reinbold Racing announced the signing of Rahal for the Iowa Corn Indy 250 at Iowa Speedway, filling in for the injured Mike Conway in the No. 24 entry on a one-off basis. Rahal returned to Newman/Haas Racing for 6 of the remaining 8 races of the 2010 season, starting with Toronto, and returned to Sarah Fisher Racing for the Kentucky Speedway race. Rahal's 2010 totals included 12 starts for four teams and a 20th-place finish in points.

On October 10, 2010, Rahal finished runner-up at the RoboPong 200 all-star kart event at the New Castle Motorsports Park with teammate Conor Daly.

2011–2012
Rahal signed to drive the No. 38 car for Chip Ganassi Racing with Service Central sponsorship beginning in 2011 as the team expanded from two to four cars and continued with the team into 2012.

Rahal, co-drove the No. 01 TELMEX/Target Chip Ganassi Racing with Felix Sabates car to victory in the Rolex 24 at Daytona along with Scott Pruett, Memo Rojas, and Joey Hand. It came 30 years after his father, Bobby won the race, partnering with Brian Redman and Bob Garretson.

2013–2020
From 2013 onwards, Graham Rahal returned to his father's team Rahal Letterman Lanigan Racing. While a second-place finish at the 2013 Long Beach Grand Prix showed promise early in the season, 2013 would be a building year for the new partnership.

2015 brought great results for Rahal with three podiums in the first half of the season; 2nd at Barber Motorsports Park, 2nd at the 2015 Grand Prix of Indianapolis, and a 3rd at the Sunday race in Detroit.

During the 2015 season, Rahal broke a 6+ year winless streak by winning the 2015 MAVTV 500 at Auto Club Speedway in Fontana, CA. Rahal again won later in the season at the 2015 Honda Indy 200 at Mid-Ohio. The win was especially poignant for Rahal since he grew up in Ohio and also put Rahal in the championship hunt for the first time in his career.  Rahal ended finishing 4th in the standings after a disappointing performance in the last two races.

2016 brought another win to Rahal's almost decade-long IndyCar career after winning the 2016 Firestone 600 at Texas Motor Speedway. The margin of victory was only .008 of a second, the fifth-closest finish in IndyCar/CART history.

In 2017, Rahal had six top-five finishes, down from eight top-five finishes in both 2015 and 2016, but he did pick up wins in both races at the Detroit Grand Prix (June 3 and 4).

In 2018, Rahal scored a best finish of second from the streets of St. Petersburg and finished the championship eighth overall.

2019 marked the fifth-straight year Rahal finished in the top 10 for the IndyCar Series championship, finishing eighth overall with a best finish of third at Texas Motor Speedway.

Rahal finished 2nd at the 2020 IndyGP.

Business interests
Rahal opened Graham Rahal Performance (GRP), in May 2017 and has grown the business from an automotive tuning and parts shop to including exotic car sales. GRP is based in Brownsburg, Indiana.

Graham is also a junior partner with Bobby Rahal Automotive Group, a network of car dealerships in western and central Pennsylvania.

Personal life

Rahal was born in Columbus, Ohio. He attended New Albany school systems in Ohio and graduated in June 2007 with plans to attend Denison University. Rahal is a die-hard Ohio State fan and enjoys NHL hockey and golf. He is a car enthusiast and owns a growing Ducati collection.

Rahal is married to former NHRA drag racer Courtney Force, daughter of 16-time NHRA drag racing champion and legend John Force. In May 2020, the pair announced they were expecting their first child; in November she gave birth to a daughter, Harlan Ann Rahal.

Rahal started the Graham Rahal Foundation in 2009 to support Alex's Lemonade Stand for Childhood Cancer and The Association of Hole in the Wall Camps (known as SeriousFun Children's Network as of April 2012). In 2019, Rahal and wife Courtney Force took on the foundation in a joint effort, changing the name to Graham & Courtney Rahal Foundation (GCRF). GCRF supports Turns for Troops, benefitting the national nonprofit SoldierStrong, and Colorado State University's One Cure.

Motorsports career results

Career summary

† Team result

SCCA National Championship Runoffs

Complete A1 Grand Prix results
(key) (Races in bold indicate pole position; races in italics indicate fastest lap)

American open-wheel racing results
(key) (Races in bold indicate pole position, races in italics indicate fastest race lap)

Champ Car Atlantic

Champ Car

IndyCar Series
(key)

* Season still in progress.
 1 The Las Vegas Indy 300 was abandoned after Dan Wheldon died from injuries sustained in a 15-car crash on lap 11.''

Indianapolis 500

WeatherTech SportsCar Championship
(key) (Races in bold indicate pole position)

References

External links

 
 
 Graham Rahal Un-official Fan Zone
 Graham Rahal career overview 
 Graham Rahal career statistics at Driver Database
 IndyCar 11 in '11 video
 IndyCar 36: Graham Rahal - IndyCar documentary

1989 births
Living people
24 Hours of Daytona drivers
A1 Team Lebanon drivers
American Le Mans Series drivers
Atlantic Championship drivers
Champ Car drivers
Force family
Formula BMW USA drivers
Indianapolis 500 drivers
Indy Lights drivers
IndyCar Series drivers
Lebanese racing drivers
People from New Albany, Ohio
Indy Pro 2000 Championship drivers
Racing drivers from Columbus, Ohio
Racing drivers from Ohio
Rolex Sports Car Series drivers
SCCA National Championship Runoffs winners
Sportspeople from Columbus, Ohio
Supercars Championship drivers
WeatherTech SportsCar Championship drivers
Conquest Racing drivers
Newman/Haas Racing drivers
Sarah Fisher Racing drivers
Rahal Letterman Lanigan Racing drivers
Chip Ganassi Racing drivers
Meyer Shank Racing drivers
BMW M drivers
Dreyer & Reinbold Racing drivers
Kelly Racing drivers
Team Penske drivers
A1 Grand Prix drivers
Carlin racing drivers